Statistics of Portuguese Liga in the 1958/1959 season.

Overview

It was contested by 14 teams, and F.C. Porto won the championship.

League standings

Results

References

Primeira Liga seasons
1
Portugal